The 1998 United States Senate election in Idaho was held November 3, 1998 alongside other elections to the United States Senate in other states as well as elections to the United States House of Representatives and various state and local elections. Incumbent Republican U.S. Senator Dirk Kempthorne decided to retire after one term to run for governor. Republican nominee Mike Crapo won the open seat.

Democratic primary

Candidates 
 Bill Mauk, Chairman of the Idaho Democratic Party

Results

Republican primary

Candidates 
 Mike Crapo, U.S. Representative
 Matt Lambert

Results

General election

Candidates 
 Mike Crapo (R), U.S. Representative
 George Mansfeld (NL)
 Bill Mauk (D), Chairman of the Idaho Democratic Party

Results

See also 
 1998 United States Senate elections

References 

United States Senate
Idaho
1998